Batocera ammiralis is a species of beetle in the family Cerambycidae. It was described by Breuning in 1947. It is known from Papua New Guinea.

References

Batocerini
Beetles described in 1947